"Kiss Me in the Car" is a song co-written and recorded by American country music artist John Berry.  It was released in September 1993 as the second single from the album John Berry.  The song reached #22 on the Billboard Hot Country Singles & Tracks chart.  The song was written by Berry and Chris Waters.

Chart performance

References

1993 singles
1993 songs
John Berry (country singer) songs
Songs written by Chris Waters
Liberty Records singles